The year 1662 in science and technology involved some significant events.

Botany
 February 16 – John Evelyn presents the basic text of his Sylva, or A Discourse of Forest-Trees and the Propagation of Timber to the College for the Promoting of Physico-Mathematical Experimental Learning, probably the earliest treatise on forestry (it is published in book form in 1664).

Chemistry
 First attempt to manufacture graphite drawing sticks from powdered graphite (mixed with sulphur and antimony), in Nuremberg, Germany.

Physics
 Robert Boyle publishes Boyle's law, in the second edition of his New Experiments Physico-Mechanicall, Touching The Spring of the Air, and its Effects (Oxford).

Statistics
 John Graunt, in one of the earliest uses of statistics, publishes information about births and deaths in London.

Events
 July 15 – The Royal Society of London receives its royal charter. Robert Hooke becomes its Curator of Experiments this year.

Births
 December 13 – Francesco Bianchini, Italian astronomer (died 1729)

Deaths
 April 22 – John Tradescant the Younger, English botanist (born 1608)
 August 19 – Blaise Pascal, French mathematician and physicist (born 1623)

References 

 
17th century in science
1660s in science